The CKD7C is a Co-Co diesel locomotive manufactured by the CNR Dalian.

Overview
On 3 November 2008, four diesel-electric locomotives were shipped to the DRC from China's Dalian port.  They are 1,800 hp CKD7C models, manufactured by the China Northern Rail Corporation Limited (CNR).  The company also offers a 1,000 hp model for the 1,067 mm gauge – the CKD5.

Specifications
Technical specifications follow:
Track gauge: 
Transmission:  AC/DC
Wheel arrangement Co-Co
Axle load: 15.0t
Power rating 1,340 kW
Design speed: 
Minimum curve negotiation radius: 
Length over coupler centres: 
Diesel engine model CAT3512
Application: Mixed traffic on main line

References

Co-Co locomotives
Railway locomotives introduced in 2008
CRRC Dalian locomotives